Half Dome Nunatak is a nunatak lying  south of the Cobham Range in Antarctica, at the mouth of Lucy Glacier. It was so named by the northern party of the New Zealand Geological Survey Antarctic Expedition (1961–62) because it is rounded on one side and cut into sheer cliffs on the other side.

References

Nunataks of the Ross Dependency
Shackleton Coast